Frederic Franklyn Van de Water (1890-1968) was an American journalist and writer. He was an honorary sergeant in the New York State Troopers. In 1924, he travelled in the West Indies investigated and reported about rum pirates and Chinese smugglers.

He wrote for Harper's Magazine.

He wrote short stories for pulp fiction magazines such as Collier's.

In the 1949 historical novel The Green Cockade (also published as Catch a Falling Star) Van de Water described the complicated history of Vermont during the American War of Independence - with Ethan Allen waging in effect a double war of independence, both sharing in the common struggle against the British but also struggling to keep Vermont independent against the annexation efforts of New York State.

He was the son of  Virginia Terhune and Frederic F. Van de Water Sr.

Books

Glory-hunter; a life of General Custer
Rudyard Kipling's Vermont feud (On the relations of R. Kipling and Beatty Balestier) 
Horsemen of the law
 Grey riders; the story of the New York state troopers
 The Green Cockade/Catch a Falling Star, 1949                                         
- "Wings of the Morning", 1955
- "The Real McCoy" with Publisher's foreword by Stephen Jones
A Home in the Country copyright 1937 published by John Day in association with Reynal & Hitchcock

References

External links
 
 

1890 births
1968 deaths
20th-century American journalists
American male journalists
Pulp fiction writers